Nicolas Janvier (born 11 August 1998) is a French professional footballer who plays as a midfielder for Vitória Guimarães.

Club career 
Born in Saint-Malo, Brittany, Janvier moved from hometown club Jeanne d'Arc to Stade Rennais F.C. at the age of 8, a year after starting to play football. He made his Ligue 1 debut on 11 December 2015 against SM Caen, as an 84th-minute substitute for Juan Fernando Quintero in a 1–1 home draw.

Janvier signed his first professional contract in August 2015, a three-year deal that made him only the third 17-year-old to turn professional at Rennes, after Yoann Gourcuff and Damien Le Tallec. He made only 15 appearances in all competitions (four starts), being used mainly in the reserve team in the Championnat National 3 and 2. He left in August 2019 on a three-year deal to Vitória de Guimarães in Portugal's Primeira Liga.

Janvier was again a reserve in his first year in Portugal, scoring 8 goals in 23 games including braces in wins over C.D.C. Montalegre and Berço SC. He made his Primeira Liga debut on 18 September 2020, playing the full 90 minutes of a 1–0 home loss to Belenenses SAD, the first game managed by Tiago Mendes.

International career
Janvier earned 53 caps for France at youth level, scoring 16 goals. He made his debut on 17 September 2013 with the under-16 team in a 1–0 friendly win over Wales in La Sauvetat-du-Dropt, and scored in a 6–0 win against the same country two days later. He was part of the under-17 team that won the 2015 UEFA European Championship  in Bulgaria, though he missed in the semi-final penalty shootout against Belgium.

Honours
France
UEFA European Under-17 Championship: 2015

References

External links

 

1998 births
Living people
Sportspeople from Saint-Malo
Association football midfielders
French footballers
French expatriate footballers
France youth international footballers
Ligue 1 players
Championnat National 2 players
Championnat National 3 players
Primeira Liga players
Campeonato de Portugal (league) players
Stade Rennais F.C. players
Vitória S.C. B players
Vitória S.C. players
Footballers from Brittany
French expatriate sportspeople in Portugal
Expatriate footballers in Portugal